The culture of South Australia is similar to the culture of Australia. The state has a variety of wine-producing regions including the popular tourist destination Barossa Valley. A majority of the population is focused in and around the Adelaide metropolitan area. The geographical landmass varies widely and a significant portion of Adelaide's terrain is hilly. 

Adelaide Hills feature many European villages and small towns, which reflect the states immigration trends from the 1880s. In sport, the state has the second highest rate of event attendance of all states and territories with 49% of South Australians aged 15 years and over attending a sporting event each year. 

Some scenes of the internationally acclaimed Picnic at Hanging Rock were filmed in the rural areas of the state, such as Martindale Hall.

See also
 Tourism in Australia
 Music of Australia
 South Australian Museum

References